Guffrie Gibson Smith (born January 14, 1977) is an American college basketball coach who was most recently the head coach at High Point University. He was previously the head coach at Loyola University Maryland.

Early life and college playing career
A native of Leonardtown, Maryland, Smith is the oldest son of college basketball coach Tubby Smith. G.G. attended Cascia Hall Preparatory School while his father coached at the University of Tulsa. After graduating from Cascia Hall in 1995, Smith attended the University of Georgia and played basketball for the Georgia Bulldogs under Tubby Smith, who had been hired to coach at Georgia the same year. A point guard, Smith joined the starting lineup as a sophomore and averaged 9.5 points and 2.4 rebounds. He later played his junior and senior seasons under Ron Jirsa. As a senior, Smith averaged 8.5 points and 2.3 rebounds. Smith graduated from Georgia in December 1999 with a degree in health and physical education.

Coaching career
Smith began his coaching career as an assistant coach and teacher at Lexington Catholic High School in Lexington, Kentucky. In the fall of 2000, Smith enrolled at the University of Kentucky for graduate school and joined his father's staff as a graduate assistant. Completing his master's degree in sports management in 2002, Smith became an assistant coach at Tennessee Tech. From 2004 to 2006, Smith was an assistant at Armstrong Atlantic State, then at Johns Hopkins for the 2006–07 season.

After six seasons as an assistant under Jimmy Patsos, Smith succeeded Patsos as head coach at Loyola University Maryland in 2013 after Patsos took the head coaching job at Siena.

On March 8, 2018, Smith announced that he was resigning from Loyola after 5 seasons. He was subsequently hired by his father Tubby Smith as an assistant at High Point. On February 16, 2022, the elder Smith stepped down as coach, making G.G. his replacement. In his first full season, Smith led High Point to a 14-17 record. He was fired on March 3, 2023.

Head coaching record

References

1977 births
Living people
American men's basketball coaches
American men's basketball players
Basketball coaches from Maryland
Basketball players from Maryland
College men's basketball head coaches in the United States
Georgia Bulldogs basketball players
High Point Panthers men's basketball coaches
High school basketball coaches in the United States
Johns Hopkins Blue Jays men's basketball coaches
Loyola Greyhounds men's basketball coaches
People from St. Mary's County, Maryland
Point guards
Sportspeople from Tulsa, Oklahoma
Tennessee Tech Golden Eagles men's basketball coaches
University of Kentucky alumni